Dadaji Ramaji Khobragade (died 3 June 2018) was an Indian cultivator who bred and refined a high-yielding variety of paddy, HMT.

D.R. Khobragade belonged to Nanded Village from Nagbhid Taluka of Chandrapur district, Maharashtra.

Around 1983, Khobragade noticed a plant with slightly different appearance and yellowish seeds in his field planted with the 'Patel 3' variety of paddy, which he experimented on in the years to come. The new variety was found giving high yields compared to the varieties available at that time. By 1990, the variety was given a name HMT.

Despite his innovation, Khobragade lived a poor and mostly neglected life.  He got some media attention when Forbes magazine named him among seven most powerful entrepreneurs of India in 2010.

He first shot to fame when he accused the state-run Punjabrao Krishi Vidyapeeth (PKV) of taking credit for the brand that he had originally bred on his farm and given to the university scientists in 1994.

While Dadaji claimed the PKV had appropriated his variety, the PKV held that they sourced it from him and significantly improved the variety with their scientific inputs. The issue remains unresolved till date. PKV never officially gave Dadaji his credit in its varietal release proposal.

The National Innovation Foundation (NIF) recognised his work in 2003-04 and the Maharashtra government gave him the Krishi Bhushan and Krishi Ratna awards for his innovations. One of his varieties called Chinnour is akin to the Basmati of the north. He named his latest variety after himself: DRK.

Awards 

 First Richharia award for developing HMT and other paddy varieties.
2005: Vasantrao Naik Krishibhushan Award.
 2005: National award for HMT paddy variety at third National Grassroots Innovation Awards.
 2009: Diffusion award for DRK paddy variety at fifth National Grassroots Innovation Awards.
2010: Dr. Panjabrao Deshmukh Krishiratna award by Government of Maharashtra.

Notes and References

20th-century births
2018 deaths
20th-century Indian inventors
Marathi people
People from Chandrapur district